Xinjian Subdistrict is a subdistrict in Ang'angxi District, Qiqihar, Heilongjiang province, China. , it has 2 residential communities under its administration.

See also 
 List of township-level divisions of Heilongjiang

References 

Township-level divisions of Heilongjiang
Qiqihar